Christian virtue may refer to:

 Seven virtues
 Theological virtues

See also 

 Virtue
 Virtue ethics
 Cardinal virtues
 Christian ethics
 Christian values